Tiny Moving Parts is an American rock band from Benson, Minnesota. Formed by brothers William and Matthew Chevalier, and their cousin Dylan Mattheisen, the band has released eight studio albums since their 2008 formation in junior high. Their eponymously-titled most recent album was self-released on August 26, 2022.

History 
Tiny Moving Parts is a self-described family band consisting of brothers William Chevalier (drums) and Matthew Chevalier (bass, vocals), and their cousin Dylan Mattheisen (guitar, vocals) who were also all students at Benson High School. The trio started playing together in junior high and have been together since then. After releasing their first album Waves Rise, Waves Recede, the Ocean Is Full of Waves, they followed up with their second, Moving to Antarctica on June 19, 2010. Their third album, This Couch Is Long & Full of Friendship, was released through Kind of Like Records on January 13, 2013. On June 12, "Clouds Above My Head" was released as a free download. On July 9, the album was released physically. Later in the month, the group toured alongside The Front Bottoms, Frameworks and Hostage Calm.

In March 2014, the group performed with Japanther. Later that month, the band signed to Triple Crown Records. In April and May, the group went on tour with Frameworks, Gates and Free Throw. In June, the group supported Modern Baseball on their headlining US tour. On July 9, "Always Focused" was made available for streaming. On September 9, they released their fourth album, Pleasant Living. In July and August, the group supported State Champs on their headlining US tour, dubbed The Shot Boys of Summer Tour. Between October and December, the group supported Modern Baseball on their headlining US tour. In March 2016, they announced that their fifth album, Celebrate, will be released on May 20, 2016. In the same announcement, they released the first single from Celebrate entitled "Happy Birthday". The band went on a spring 2016 tour supporting The Wonder Years, Letlive and Microwave. The group's next album, Swell, was released on January 26, 2018. On June 25, 2019, it was announced that the band had signed to Hopeless Records. Their seventh album, breathe, was released on September 13. Their single “Life Jacket”, which was their final release with Hopeless Records, was released on May 28, 2021, with an accompanying music video being released on June 8. Their eponymously-titled eighth album was self-released on August 26, 2022.

Members
 Dylan Mattheisen – lead vocals, guitar
 William "Bill" Chevalier – drums
 Matthew Chevalier – bass guitar, backing vocals

Discography
Studio albums
Waves Rise, Waves Recede, the Ocean Is Full of Waves (self-released, 2008)
Moving to Antarctica (self-released, 2010)
This Couch Is Long & Full of Friendship (Kind of Like Records, 2013)
Pleasant Living (Triple Crown Records, 2014)
Celebrate (Triple Crown Records, Big Scary Monsters(UK/Europe), 2016)
Swell (Triple Crown Records, Big Scary Monsters(UK/Europe), 2018)
breathe (Hopeless Records, 2019)
Tiny Moving Parts (self-released, 2022)
Extended plays
The Dan Martin Split w/ Victor Shores (2011)
7" Old Maid/Coffee with Tom (2012)
Tiny Moving Parts/Old Gray Split (2014)

Videography
"Waterbed" (2012) Directed by Kevin Ackley
"Clouds Above My Head" (2013) Directed by Falcon Gott & TMP
"Vacation Bible School" (2013) Directed by Falcon Gott
"Fair Trade" (2014) Directed by Tiny Moving Parts
"Always Focused" (2014) Directed by Kyle Thrash
"Entrances and Exits" (2014) Directed by Tiny Moving Parts
"Sundress" (2015)
"Headache" (2016) Directed by Kyle Thrash
"Common Cold" (2016) Directed by Kyle Thrash
"Caution" (2017) Directed by John Komar
"Applause" (2018) Directed by Samuel Halleen
"Feel Alive" (2018) Directed by John Komar
"For the Sake of Brevity" (2019) Directed by Brendan Lauer
"Medicine" (2019) Directed by Lewis Cater
"Bloody Nose" (2019) Directed by Michael Herrick
"Vertebrae" (2019) Directed by Max Moore
"Life Jacket" (2021)

References

American emo musical groups
Indie rock musical groups from Minnesota
Triple Crown Records artists
Hopeless Records artists
Math rock groups
Musical groups established in 2008
People from Benson, Minnesota
Emo revival groups